Burkes Law is an American crime drama television series that aired on CBS during the 1993–94 and  1994–95 television seasons. It was a revival of original Burkes Law television series, and starred Gene Barry as millionaire cop Amos Burke, now deputy chief instead of a captain, and Peter Barton as his son Det. Peter Burke. It was produced by Spelling Television.

Background 
In the revival of the show, which ran on CBS from 1994 to 1995 and was produced by Aaron Spelling's production company, the title again became Burke's Law and Burke was back at work as a police detective. In the second incarnation, Burke, now a deputy chief, was assisted by his son, Peter (Peter Barton).

The revival, even more than the original program, was regarded as being largely camp. In a nostalgic touch, many of the guest stars were Barry's peers in 1960s cop shows and spy-fi programs, including Patrick Macnee (The Avengers) and Peter Graves (Mission: Impossible). Anne Francis appeared reprising the character Honey West (though she was called "Honey Best" for legal reasons).

Cast 
 Gene Barry as Chief Amos Burke
 Peter Barton as Det. Peter Burke
 Danny Kamekona as Henry
 Bever-Leigh Banfield as Lily Morgan
 Dom DeLuise as Vinnie Piatte

Episodes

Series overview

Season 1 (1994)

Season 2 (1995)

References

External links 
 
 

1990s American crime drama television series
1994 American television series debuts
1995 American television series endings
CBS original programming
Fictional portrayals of the Los Angeles Police Department
Television shows set in Los Angeles
Television series by Spelling Television
Television series reboots
American sequel television series
American detective television series
English-language television shows